IMS may refer to:

Organizations

Companies
 Integrated Micro Solutions, a GPU manufacturer
 Intelligent Micro Software, a former developer of Multiuser DOS, REAL/32, and REAL/NG
 International Military Services, a UK Ministry of Defence owned company for selling weapons overseas
 IMS Health, Information Medical Statistics, a US company providing data services for healthcare, ticker symbol NYSE:IMS
 IMS Associates, Inc., an early computer manufacturer
 IMS Bildbyrå, a Swedish stock photograph agency

Institutes
 IMS International Medical Services, of the State University Medical Center Freiburg, Germany
 Indian Mathematical Society
 Indian Medical Service, a military medical service in British India
 Indian Missionary Society, an Indian Catholic Religious Institute (Varanasi)
 Insight Meditation Society, a Buddhist organization in Barre, Massachusetts
 Institute of Mathematical Statistics
 International Magicians Society
 International Micropatrological Society
 International Military Staff, the executive body of the NATO Military Committee
 International Mountain Society, for mountain research, Bern, Switzerland
 International Musicological Society, a learned society for musicology in Basel, Switzerland
 Irish Marching Society, Rockford, Illinois, US
 Irish Mathematical Society
 Iranian Mathematical Society

Education
 IMS Unison University, formerly Institute of Management Studies
 Institute of Management Studies, Devi Ahilya University, Devi Ahilya University, India
 Institute of Medical Sciences, Banaras Hindu University, Varanasi, India
 Iowa Mennonite School, Iowa, US

International
 International Monitoring System, a division of the Comprehensive Nuclear-Test-Ban Treaty Organization

Science and technology
 IEEE MTT-S International Microwave Symposium, an annual conference
 Immunomagnetic separation, a laboratory technique
 Indian Mini Satellite bus, Indian Space Research Organisation (ISRO)
 Industrial methylated spirit
 Insulated metal substrate, for power electronics
 Intelligent maintenance system, to predict machine failure
 Intelligent Munitions System, American smart mine
 Intermediate shaft, of a car transmission; see Porsche Intermediate Shaft Bearing issue
 Intermediate syndrome, in organophosphate poisoning
 Intramuscular stimulation or dry needling
 Ion mobility spectrometry
 Irritable male syndrome, an annual behavior in some mammals

Computing and Internet
 IBM Information Management System
 Internet Map Server
 Internet Medieval Sourcebook
 IP Multimedia Subsystem, a framework for delivering services over mobile networks

Other uses
 Indianapolis Motor Speedway, Speedway, Indiana, US
 Integrated master schedule, a US DoD planning tool
 International Measurement System, a handicapping system used in sailboat racing
 International Music Summit, a yearly dance conference held in Ibiza

See also
 Ims, Norwegian surname